Holderness was a local government district and borough in northern England, named after the Holderness peninsula.

It was formed on 1 April 1974 along with the non-metropolitan county of Humberside in which it was situated.  It was formed from part of the administrative county of Yorkshire, East Riding, namely:

The municipal borough of Hedon, 
The urban districts of Hornsea and Withernsea, 
The Holderness Rural District.

On 1 April 1996, Humberside and the borough were abolished, and it became part of the new unitary East Riding of Yorkshire.

References

Former non-metropolitan districts of Humberside
Former boroughs in England
borough